The Key  is a 1934 American Pre-Code film directed by Michael Curtiz. It was re-issued as High Peril (pre-release title Sue of Fury) in 1960.

The story, concerning a love triangle, is set during the Irish War of Independence.

Plot
Captain Bill Tennant (William Powell) is a British officer stationed in Dublin in 1920. Tennant had a month long tryst with Norah, the wife of his friend, British intelligence officer Captain Andrew Kerr, three years ago before Norah and Andy met.

Tennant's first assignment is to capture a notorious Sinn Féin member, Peadar Conlan.  His first attempt is a failure, and Kerr is ordered to relieve Tennant overnight. Norah is frightened by his assignment and begs her husband not to go.  After Kerr leaves, we see a flashback to when Tennant and Norah were involved, several years before.

Kerr leads the search for Conlan.  He finds and captures him.  When he arrives home, very late, Norah is still up and still dressed.  Tennant is also there and insists “We've got to tell him.”  Norah says that is for her to do, sends Tennant away. and tells her husband “Yes.” She reminds her husband that he has always known that there had been someone else. That someone was Tennant, and the passion she thought long past has flared up at this meeting. Kerr rushes out, despite her pleadings that he'll be killed; he says that might solve both their problems. Tennant sees him leave and intercepts a distraught Norah to ask where Kerr is headed; Bill promises to find him.

Conlan is sentenced to hang by the British military.  Shortly after, Kerr is spotted and followed to a pub where he is ambushed and abducted by men and women waiting in the alley. When Tennant arrives at the military post the next morning, he finds Norah waiting there for news of her husband. She tells him that a part of her went out the door with Kerr.  Her love for Tennant was a romantic dream: He's "just three years too late.”

A messenger arrives from Sinn Féin.  He claims to be a peacemaker, and tells the general that Kerr will be released if Conlan is.  But the general tells him Conlan will be hanged at 6:00 a.m. the next morning.  Norah begs the general to comply, but the general refuses.

Tennant follows the Sinn Féin representative and tries to bargain  for Kerr's life, but is told nothing will do except the release of Conlan.  He returns to HQ and, against orders, goes into the general's office, breaks into his desk, and forges a release for Conlan.  At 3 am, outside the prison, a crowd of people are on their knees praying . Kerr's captors set him free.  The next morning, the town celebrates Conlan's release and the British mount a manhunt for Conlan.  Tennant's forgery is discovered, and Kerr is distressed to find his friend has committed career suicide to free him. Outside HQ, Tennant tells Kerr that Norah has been in love with a glamorous memory but that seeing Tennant again killed all the romance for her and caused her to realize she really loves her husband. Tennant presents himself to the general, knowing that he will serve at least three years in jail. Under arrest, Tennant is driven away through the cheering crowds while the Kerrs look on.

Cast
 William Powell as Capt. Bill Tennant  
 Edna Best as Norah Kerr  
 Colin Clive as Capt. Andrew Kerr  
 Hobart Cavanaugh as Homer, Tennant's aide  
 Halliwell Hobbes as General C.O. Furlong  
 Donald Crisp as Peadar Conlan  
 J.M. Kerrigan as O'Duffy  
 Henry O'Neill as Dan  
 Phil Regan as Irishman killed by Capt. Kerr
 Arthur Treacher as Lt. Merriman, Furlong's aide  
 Maxine Doyle as Pauline O'Connor  
 Arthur Aylesworth as Kirby  
 Gertrude Short as Evie, a barmaid  
 Anne Shirley as Flower Girl (as Dawn O'Day)

Background
One of the writers of the film script was Captain Jocelyn Lee Hardy, a decorated veteran of World War I who had made repeated escapes from German prisoner of war camps. After the Great War Hardy served as a military intelligence officer attached to the Auxiliary Division of the Royal Irish Constabulary during the Irish War of Independence. He specialised in interrogating IRA prisoners and survived several attempts on his life by the Irish Republican Army.

References

External links
 
 
 
 

1934 films
1934 drama films
American black-and-white films
1930s English-language films
Films directed by Michael Curtiz
Films set in the 1920s
Films set in Dublin (city)
Films set in Ireland
Irish War of Independence films
Warner Bros. films
American drama films
1930s American films